George Standish Weed (1862 - January 18, 1919) was an American lawyer and politician from New York.

Biography
He was born in 1862 in Plattsburgh, New York, the son of Assemblyman Smith M. Weed and Caroline (Standish) Weed.

He was a member of the New York State Assembly (Clinton Co.) in 1887 and 1888. He was Judge of the Clinton County Court from 1889 to 1890. He was appointed by President Grover Cleveland as Collector of the Port of Lake Champlain in 1895, and remained in office until 1898. He was Deputy New York Superintendent of State Prisons under John B. Riley, and was Acting Warden of Sing Sing in 1914.

He died on January 18, 1919, in Washington, D.C.

References

Wardens of Sing Sing
1862 births
1919 deaths
Democratic Party members of the New York State Assembly
Politicians from Plattsburgh, New York
19th-century American politicians